An abwe or chekeré is a Cuban musical ensemble that uses gourds.   It is a product of cabildos, historical congregations of African slaves brought to Cuba.

See also 
 music of Cuba
 slavery
 Caribbean music

References

Cuban musical instruments
Gourd musical instruments